Karl Leopold of Mecklenburg-Schwerin (26 November 1678 – 28 November 1747) was Duke of Mecklenburg-Schwerin from 1713 to 1747.

He was the second son of Frederick, Duke of Mecklenburg-Grabow, and his wife Christine von Hessen-Homburg (1653–1722). He succeeded his brother Frederick William, Duke of Mecklenburg-Schwerin, in 1713.

Mecklenburg-Schwerin began its existence during a series of constitutional struggles between the duke and the nobles. The heavy debt incurred by Charles Leopold, who had joined Russian Empire in a war against Sweden, brought matters to a head; Charles VI interfered, and in 1728 the imperial court of justice declared the duke incapable of governing. His brother, Christian Ludwig II, was appointed administrator of the duchy.

Karl Leopold married three times.  His first wife was Sophia Hedwig of Nassau-Dietz (1690–1734), daughter of Henry Casimir II, Prince of Nassau-Dietz, and his wife Henriëtte Amalia van Anhalt-Dessau.  They married on 27 May 1709 in Leeuwarden and divorced in 1710. There were no children from this marriage.

His second wife was Christine von Lepel (1692–1728), daughter of Nicolaus Friedrich von Lepel and his wife Leveka von Plessen. They married on 7 June 1710 at Doberau and divorced on 2 October 1711.  There were no children from this marriage, either.

His third wife was the Grand Duchess Catherine Ivanovna of Russia, daughter of Tsar Ivan V of Russia and his wife Praskovia Saltykova. They married on 19 April 1716 in Danzig.  There was one daughter born of this marriage, the Grand Duchess Anna Leopoldovna of Russia. She married Duke Anthony Ulrich of Brunswick and had 5 children. She served as Regent of Russia for her son Ivan VI from 1740 to 1741.

Ancestry

References
 
 Gerhard Heitz (1991) (in German). Herzog Carl Leopold von Mecklenburg-Schwerin. In Kaiser. König. Kardinal – Deutsche Fürsten 1500–1800, edited by Rolf Straubel and Ulman Weiss. Leipzig-Jena-Berlin: Urania-Verlag. .
 Valentina Grijorian (1987) (in German). Zarenschicksale – Glanz und Skandale am Hofe der Zarendynastie Romanow/Holstein-Gottorp, 1st edition. Leipzig: LeiV Buchhandels- und Verlagsanstalt GmbH. .
 Henry Vallotton (1978) (in German). Peter der Große – Russlands Aufstieg zur Großmacht, 2nd edition. Munich: Callwey Verlag. .

1678 births
1747 deaths
People from Grabow
House of Mecklenburg-Schwerin
German landowners